The Connacht School's Rugby Senior Cup is an annual rugby union competition for secondary schools affiliated to the Connacht Rugby Branch of the IRFU.

History

The Connacht School's Rugby Senior Cup is an annual rugby union schools competition organised by the Connacht Rugby Branch of the IRFU. Boys, usually of seventeen or eighteen years of age, compete for the cup with rival schools from within the province of Connacht. The competition was first held in 1913, with Garbally College, Ballinasloe the first Champions.

The first round matches are typically played towards the end of January, with the final being played in the Galway Sportsgrounds the week before Saint Patrick's Day.

Historically, Garbally College have been the most successful school in the competition lifting the cup 48 times, while Coláiste Iognáid have been the most successful team since the turn of the millennium winning eight titles in years 2002, 2005, 2006, 2008, 2009, 2011, 2016 and 2017.

The current holders (2022) are  Sligo Grammar School who beath Colaiste Iognaid, Galway by 15-10 on 15 March 2022 in the Galway Sportsgrounds.

Competition structure

The Connacht Rugby Schools Cup is a three tier competition;

Senior Cup [Senior A Cup]

The premier competition played by the strongest rugby playing schools in the region. 
Current competition format is two pools [A & B] of three teams playing each other round robin.
The Winners & Runner Up in each pool proceeding to the Semi-Finals. 

 Winner Pool A vs Runner Up Pool B
 Winner Pool B vs Runner Up Pool A

The two other tiers cater for schools who cannot consistently compete at Senior Cup level by reason of playing population or experience.

In total 30 Schools representing all five provincial counties participated in the various Connacht Rugby Senior Schools Cups in 2019.

Connacht Senior Development Cup [Senior B Cup]
Is the Second Tier Competition for schools with established Rugby programs but who due to lower playing numbers or do not have the high level of population experience to consistently compete at Senior Cup Level. 
Nine schools compete in three pools of three, leading to semifinals and a final.

Connacht Senior Emerging Cup [Senior C Cup]
Is the Third Tier Competition for Schools who have recently introduced Rugby programs within their schools.
Nine schools compete in three pools of three, leading to semifinals and a final.

The target is for schools to establish themselves within the lowest tier initially, and progress through to the highest tier.

Roll of honour

 (1) Now  Gallen Community School.
 (2) School now defunct.

Cup final results [Senior A Cup]

1910s

 1913 Garbally College
 1914 Garbally College
 1915 Garbally College
 1916 Garbally College
 1917 not played
 1918 St Joseph's Patrician College, Galway 
 1919 Ranelagh, Athlone

1920s

 1920 not played
 1921 not played
 1922 St Joseph's Patrician College , Galway
 1923 Ranelagh, Athlone
 1924 Coláiste Iognáid, Galway
 1925 Coláiste Iognáid, Galway
 1926 Garbally College
 1927 Coláiste Iognáid, Galway
 1928 Coláiste Iognáid, Galway
 1929 Garbally College

1930s

 1930 St Joseph's Patrician College Galway
 1931 Garbally College
 1932 Collegians/St Joseph's Patrician College, Galway
 1933 not played
 1934 not played
 1935 not played
 1936 Garbally College
 1937 Garbally College
 1938 Garbally College
 1939 Garbally College

1940s

 1940 Garbally College
 1941 Galway Grammar School
 1942 Garbally College
 1943 not played
 1944 not played
 1945 not played
 1946 not played
 1947 not played
 1948 not played
 1949 Garbally College

1950s

 1950 Garbally College
 1951 Collegians
 1952 Garbally College
 1953 Garbally College
 1954 St Joseph's Patrician College, Galway
 1955 Garbally College
 1956 Garbally College
 1957 Garbally College
 1958 Garbally College
 1959 St Joseph's Patrician College, Galway

1960s

1960 St Joseph's Patrician College, Galway
1961 Sligo Grammar School
1962 Sligo Grammar School
1963 Sligo Grammar School
1964 St Joseph's Patrician College, Galway
1965 St Joseph's Patrician College, Galway
1966 Wilson Hospital
1967 - Not played due to UK & IRL Foot & Mouth epidemic.
1968 - Not played due to UK & IRL Foot & Mouth epidemic.
1969 Sligo Grammar School

1970s

 1970 St Joseph's Patrician College, Galway beat Garbally College by 6–0
 1971 Garbally College
 1972 Garbally College
 1973 Garbally College
 1974 Garbally College
 1975 Clifden Community School beat Garbally College by 10–6
 1976 Garbally College
 1977 Marist College, Athlone beat Sligo Grammar School
 1978 Garbally College
 1979 Coláiste Iognáid, Galway

1980s

 1980 Sligo Grammar School
 1981 St Joseph's Patrician College, Galway
 1982 Garbally College
 1983 Garbally College
 1984 Garbally College
 1985 Coláiste Iognáid, Galway beat St Joseph's Patrician College, Galway
 1986 Garbally College beat Colaiste Iognaid, Galway
 1987 Garbally College
 1988 Garbally College beat St Joseph's Patrician College, Galway) 9 – 6 Sportsground Galway; Garbally, Balfe 6, Carey 3) 
 1989 Garbally College beat St Joseph's Patrician College, Galway) 18 – 6 at Galwegians RFC, Galway

1990s

 1990 Garbally College beat Sligo Grammar School
 1991 Garbally College
 1992 Garbally College
 1993 St. Joseph's College, Galway
 1994 St. Joseph's College, Galway beat Sligo Grammar School
 1995 Garbally College beat Sligo Grammar School
 1996 Garbally College beat Sligo Grammar School
 1997 Garbally College beat Sligo Grammar School
 1998 Garbally College beat St. Saran's College, Ferbane
 1999 Sligo Grammar School beat St Joseph's Patrician College, Galway by 24–5

2000s

 2000 Sligo Grammar School beat St. Saran's College, Ferbane by 24–10
 2001 Garbally College beat Portumna Community School
 2002  Colaiste Iognaid, Galway beat Garbally College
 2003 Sligo Grammar School beat Garbally College
 2004 St. Saran's College, Ferbane beat Sligo Grammar School by 20–0
 2005 Colaiste Iognaid, Galway beat Sligo Grammar School by 16–3
 2006  Colaiste Iognaid, Galway beat Sligo Grammar School by 13–10
 2007 Garbally College beat Marist College, Athlone by 25 – 18
 2008  Colaiste Iognaid, Galway beat Marist College, Athlone by 10 – 7
 2009  Colaiste Iognaid, Galway beat Sligo Grammar School by 10–3

2010s

 2010 Sligo Grammar School beat Colaiste Iognaid by 26–11
 2011  Colaiste Iognaid, Galway beat Sligo Grammar School by 23–13
 2012 Marist College, Athlone beat Sligo Grammar School 12–0
 2013 Marist College, Athlone beat Garbally College by 23 – 11
2014 Sligo Grammar School beat Garbally College 10–9 (after 10–10 draw)
 2015 Garbally College beat Summerhill College, Sligo, by 19 – 18
 2016  Colaiste Iognaid, Galway beat Garbally College by 16–15
 2017  Colaiste Iognaid, Galway beat Summerhill College, Sligo by 13-7.
 2018 Garbally College beat  Colaiste Iognaid, Galway by 45-26
2019 Garbally College beat CBS Roscommon by 26-6

2020s

 2020 Garbally College beat Sligo Grammar School by 14-12 
 2021  - No competition due to the COVID-19 pandemic.
 2022 Sligo Grammar School beat  Colaiste Iognaid, Galway  15-10.

Other cup competitions

Connacht Senior Development Cup Results [Senior B Cup]

2010s
 2009–10  St Josephs College, Galway beat Summerhill College, Sligo
 2010–11 Rice College, Westport
 2011–12  St Josephs College, Galway beat Clifden CS by 14–12.
 2012–13 St Endas College, Galway beat Clifden CS by 10–07.
 2013–14 HRC Mountbellew beat Scoil Chuimsitheach Chiaráin, An Cheathru Rua
 2014-15  St Josephs College, Galway beat Clifden CS by 7–0.
 2015-16 Scoil Chuimsitheach Chiaráin, Carraroe beat Gortnor Abbey, Crossmolina by 41-19.
 2016-17 St Muredach's College, Ballina beat Presentation College Headford by 18-12.
 2017–18 Presentation College Headford beat Gortnor Abbey, Crossmolina by 43-32.
 2018–19 Scoil Chuimsitheach Chiaráin, Carraroe beat Gallen CS by 25–19.

2020s
 2019-20 St Muredach's College, Ballina beat  St Josephs College, Galway by 15-5 .
  2020-2021 No Competition due to Covid19 Pandemic
  2021-2022 Colaiste Einde Galway beat  St Pauls  Oughterard  by 23-20.

Connacht Senior Emerging Cup Results [Senior C Cup]

2010s
 2016-17 Jesus & Mary Secondary School, Enniscrone beat St Joseph’s, Foxford by 13-10
 2017–18 Presentation College, Athenry beat Jesus & Mary Secondary School, Enniscrone by 31-22
 2018–19 St. Jarlath's College, Tuam beat St. Raphael's College, Loughrea by 10-5

2020s
  2019-2020 St Joseph’s, Foxford vs Gallen CS -  match not played  - Trophy Shared
  2020-2021 No Competition due to Covid19 Pandemic
  2021-2022  Presentation College Headford beat  Sancta Maria College, Louisburgh  by 19-0.

Galway City Senior Cup 
 2006 Coláiste Iognáid
 2007 Coláiste Iognáid
 2008 Coláiste Iognáid beat Calasanctius College, Oranmore
 2009 Coláiste Iognáid
 2010 Coláiste Iognáid
 2011 Coláiste Iognáid

Other competitions

Senior League

2000's

 2003–04 Sligo Grammar School beat Garbally College
 2004–05
 2005–06
 2006–07 Garbally College beat Coláiste Iognáid by 22–0
 2007–08 Coláiste Iognáid beat Marist College Athlone by 17–8
 2008–09 Coláiste Iognáid beat Sligo Grammar School by 8–6
 2009–10 Sligo Grammar School beat Coláiste Iognáid by 22–0

2010's

 2010–11 Coláiste Iognáid beat Calasanctius, Oranmore 26–11
 2011–12 Marist College Athlone beat Sligo Grammar School
 2012–13 Marist College Athlone beat Sligo Grammar School by 13–0
 2013–14 Garbally College beat Sligo Grammar School 11–6
From 2014-15 onward the league competition winner is determined as the team finishing top after all rounds are completed.
 2014–15 Garbally College Runner-up: Sligo Grammar School
 2015–16 Sligo Grammar School Runner-up: Garbally College
 2016–17 Sligo Grammar School Runner-up: Coláiste Iognáid
For year 2017-18, the winner is determined after a playoff final between the winners of Two Group sections.
 2017–18 Garbally College beat Coláiste Iognáid by 34–7
 2018-19 Garbally College beat Marist College, Athlone by 32-15
 2019-20 Sligo Grammar School beat Garbally College by 21-12

2020's

 2020-21  No Competition due to COVID-19 Restrictions.
 2021-22   Sligo Grammar School beat Garbally College by 25-13 
 2022-23  Sligo Grammar School beat Summerhill College by 10-3

Senior and Junior Cup Doubles
 Garbally College (25), last 2019.
 St Joseph's, Galway (The Bish) (4)
 Sligo Grammar School (2)
 Ranelagh College (1)
 Marist College, Athlone (1)
 St Jarlath's College, Tuam (1)

See also
 Connacht Rugby
 Connacht Schools Junior Cup
 Leinster Schools Senior Cup
 Munster Schools Senior Cup
 Ulster Schools Senior Cup
 Ireland national schoolboy rugby union team

References

External links
 2009 Irish Times Preview
 Senior Cup Final: Garbally College defeat Marist 06/07 (archived 2008)
 Colaiste Iognaid win the 2007–08 Connacht Schools Rugby Senior Cup (archived 2008)

High school rugby union competitions in Ireland
Rugby union competitions in Connacht
1913 establishments in Ireland